Tandis Jenhudson (born 1979) is a British musician, composer and medical doctor, best known for his work on film and television soundtracks. He has received two Royal Television Society award nominations and is the first composer to have been honoured as a BAFTA Breakthrough Brit.

Early life and education
Tandis was born in Clapham, London in 1979 and attended St George's Hanover Square Primary School, and the London Nautical School and Christ's College, Finchley secondary schools.

Despite his early interest in music, he studied Medicine at UCL and divides his time between medicine and music. He composed soundtracks for numerous short films during his early medical career, one of which was nominated for a BAFTA Cymru award in 2005.

In a 2014 interview, with PRS for Music's M-Magazine he said "I was obsessed with TV themes when I was a kid in the eighties and would even dance to some of them when they came on: "Ski Sunday, Dallas, The A-Team, Grange Hill, Airwolf, Doctor Who, Knight Rider, and Doogie Howser, M.D." He studied piano achieving Grade 8 although describes himself as a largely self-taught composer, stating "most of my musical development has come from listening to and dissecting other people's music" citing Mozart's Eine kleine Nachtmusik and Michael Jackson as examples.

Film and television work
In 2013, he received his first television broadcast credit for The March, a BBC/PBS documentary narrated by Denzel Washington which received a BAFTA nomination at the 2014 British Academy Television Awards. Directed by John Akomfrah and executive-produced by Robert Redford The March is about the historic 1963 March on Washington for Jobs and Freedom – largely remembered for Martin Luther King's famous and iconic "I Have a Dream" speech.

In March 2015, Tandis was named laureate and winner in the media composer category at the first International MediaMusic competition in Moscow, for which film composer Ennio Morricone served as honorary chairman. In April he announced via Twitter that he was working on the soundtrack for Vertigo Sea, a three-screen video art installation by John Akomfrah, selected for the 2015 Venice Biennale. In May he was revealed as one of the judges for the 60th Anniversary Ivor Novello Awards, alongside Gary Barlow and Guy Chambers. In the same year he scored the soundtrack to director Christopher Riley's National Geographic Channel film Hubble's Cosmic Journey.

In 2016, he composed the soundtrack for 'The Traffickers' an eight-part documentary TV series produced by Simon Chinn (winner of two Academy Awards for Searching for Sugar Man and Man On Wire) and Jonathan Chinn.

In 2018, he scored Civilisations, a 9-part art history television series produced by the BBC in association with PBS as a follow-up to the original 1969 landmark series Civilisation by Kenneth Clark. It was presented and narrated by Simon Schama, Mary Beard and David Olusoga. Jenhudson's soundtrack received two nominations at the RTS awards in 2018.

Video installation work
Tandis Jenhudson has created the soundtracks for two multi-screen video installations by the award-winning artist John Akomfrah.

In 2015, he scored Vertigo Sea, a 3-screen triptych that explores man's relationship with the sea and its role in the history of slavery, migration, and conflict. It premiered at the 2015 Venice Biennale and has since exhibited at numerous galleries including Arnolfini, the Turner Contemporary and as recently as 2018 at the New Museum of Contemporary Art in New York. It was nominated for a South Bank Sky Arts award in the Visual Arts category.

In 2017, he collaborated with David Julyan to score Purple, a six-screen film about climate change, human communities and the wilderness. It exhibited for 14 weeks at the Barbican in London, receiving a 4-star review from The Telegraph commenting that it offered "ravishing reminders of what we all stand to lose".

Awards and honours
In 2014, he was selected as a BAFTA Breakthrough Brit and as a result was mentored by his lifelong idol Ennio Morricone.

In 2018, he was nominated for two Royal Television Society awards for Civilisations in the categories of Original Score and Original Title Music.

Selected works

References

External links
 Official website
 

English film score composers
English male film score composers
Musicians from London
1979 births
BAFTA winners (people)
Living people